Sir John Trelawny, 4th Baronet (26 July 1691 – 2 February 1756), of Trelawne in Cornwall, was an Cornish politician who sat in the House of Commons from 1713 to 1734.
Trelawny was the eldest son of Sir Jonathan Trelawny, 3rd Baronet and his wife Rebecca Hele, daughter of Thomas Hele of Bascombe, Devon. His father was Bishop of Bristol, Bishop of Exeter and Bishop of Winchester. He matriculated at Christ Church, Oxford on 26 January 1708. He married Agnes Blackwood daughter of Thomas Blackwood of Scotland. He succeeded his father in the baronetcy on 19 July 1721.

The Trelawny family had extensive political interest in Cornwall. Trelawny entered Parliament at a by-election on 20 April 1713 as Member of Parliament for West Looe, a family seat, and was returned at the 1713 general election soon after. He was appointed Groom of the bedchamber to the Prince of Wales in 1714. In 1715 he was returned unopposed as MP for Liskeard. He was appointed Recorder of East Looe in about 1721 and retained the position until 1734. He was returned unopposed as MP for West Looe again in 1722 and then for East Looe at the 1727 general election. He did not stand in 1734.

Trelawny had no children, and his younger brother, Edward Trelawny, Governor of Jamaica, died before him. He was therefore succeeded in the baronetcy by his cousin, Harry.

References

|-

1691 births
1756 deaths
Baronets in the Baronetage of England
Members of the Parliament of Great Britain for West Looe
People from Pelynt
Politicians from Cornwall
British MPs 1713–1715
British MPs 1715–1722
British MPs 1722–1727
British MPs 1727–1734
Members of the Parliament of Great Britain for Liskeard
Members of the Parliament of Great Britain for East Looe